The Thirty-fourth Oklahoma Legislature was a meeting of the legislative branch of the government of Oklahoma, composed of the Senate and the House of Representatives. It met in Oklahoma City from January 2, 1973, to January 7, 1975, during the term of Governor David Hall.

Lieutenant Governor George Nigh served as President of the Senate, giving him a tie-breaking vote and the authority to serve as a presiding officer. James Hamilton served as President pro tempore of the Oklahoma Senate and William Willis served as Speaker of the Oklahoma House of Representatives.

Dates of sessions
First regular session: January 2-May 17, 1973
Second regular session: January 8-May 17, 1974
Previous: 33rd Legislature • Next: 35th Legislature

Party composition

Senate

House of Representatives

Leadership
President Pro Tempore: James E. Hamilton
Speaker: William Willis
Speaker Pro Tempore: Spencer Bernard
Majority Floor Leader: James Townsend
Minority leader of the House: Charles Ford

Members

Senate

Table based on 2005 state almanac.

House of Representatives

Table based on database of historic members.

References

External links
Oklahoma Senate
Oklahoma House of Representatives

Oklahoma legislative sessions
1973 in Oklahoma
1974 in Oklahoma
1973 U.S. legislative sessions
1974 U.S. legislative sessions